Jake Johnson is an American actor.

Jake Johnson may also refer to:

Jake Johnson (gymnast)
Jake Johnson (motorcyclist)
Jake Johnson (politician)

See also 

 Jack Johnson (disambiguation)
 Jake Johannsen, American comedian
Jake Jones (footballer) - British footballer